Vaivara Landscape Conservation Area is a nature park situated in Ida-Viru County, Estonia.

Its area is 86 ha.

The protected area was designated in 1959 to protect Sinimäed Hills. In 2018, the protected area was redesigned to the landscape conservation area.

See also 
 Sinimäed Hills
 Battle of Tannenberg Line

References

Nature reserves in Estonia
Geography of Ida-Viru County